St. Pauli station is a metro station located in St. Pauli, Hamburg, Germany close to the Reeperbahn. The station was opened in 1912 is served by the Hamburg U-Bahn line U3 (Ring line). St.Pauli station is often used by passengers travelling to the Hamburger Dom fair at Heiligengeistfeld, as it is located closely to its southern entrance.

Services 
St. Pauli is served by line U3 of Hamburg U-Bahn.

See also 

 List of Hamburg U-Bahn stations

References

External links 

 Line and route network plans at hvv.de 

Hamburg U-Bahn stations in Hamburg
U3 (Hamburg U-Bahn) stations
Buildings and structures in Hamburg-Mitte
Railway stations in Germany opened in 1912